Electoral bloc of the Socialist Party of Ukraine and the Peasant Party of Ukraine (Vyborchyi blok Sotsialistychnoyi partiyi Ukrayiny ta Selyanskoyi partiyi Ukrayiny) was the first political alliance and an electoral bloc in Ukraine that managed to win parliamentary seats on party list. The alliance was founded in November 1997 to participate in the 1998 parliamentary election and consisted out of the Socialist Party of Ukraine and the Peasant Party of Ukraine.

1998 parliamentary election

Top-10 party list: Oleksandr Moroz (Socialist), Serhiy Dovhan (Peasant), Viktor Suslov (unaffiliated), Ivan Chyzh (Socialist), Ivan Bokyi (unaffiliated), Stanislav Nikolayenko (Socialist), Oleksandr Tkachenko (Peasant), Kostiantyn Dovhan (Peasant), Yosyp Vinskyi (Socialist), Nina Markovska (Socialist).

Left Center
In parliament the alliance created a faction "Left Center".

On October 17, 2000 on proposition of the Left Center representative, several members of parliament (Verkhovna Rada) left in protest against the closing of publishing of "Peasant Herald".

On July 3, 2001 the faction requested on urgent creation of provisional parliamentary commission in investigation of board governors of the Agrarian bank "Ukraine" that led to bankruptcy of that bank.

References

External links

Defunct socialist parties in Ukraine
Defunct political party alliances in Ukraine
Pan-Slavism
Parliamentary factions in Ukraine
1998 establishments in Ukraine
2002 disestablishments in Ukraine
Socialist Party of Ukraine